Om fjorten dage (lit. In Fourteen Days) is a 1981 short story collection by Danish author Peter Seeberg. It won the Nordic Council's Literature Prize in 1983.

References

1981 short story collections
Danish short story collections
Nordic Council's Literature Prize-winning works